Thomas Colpitts Granger, QC (1802 – 13 August 1852) was a British Radical politician and barrister.

Admitted to Inner Temple in 1830, Granger was later elected Radical MP for City of Durham at the 1841 general election and held the seat until his death in 1852.

His son, also Sir Thomas Colpitts Granger, was a County Court judge.

References

External links
 

Members of the Parliament of the United Kingdom for City of Durham
UK MPs 1841–1847
UK MPs 1847–1852
UK MPs 1852–1857
1802 births
1852 deaths
English King's Counsel